Tracy Ham (born January 5, 1964) is an American former professional football quarterback in the Canadian Football League (CFL). He played for the Edmonton Eskimos, Toronto Argonauts, Baltimore Stallions, and Montreal Alouettes. He was known for his abilities as a dual-threat quarterback.  In his college football career with Georgia Southern he became the first quarterback to rush for 3,000 yards and pass for 5,000 yards in a career. Ham is an inductee of both the College Football Hall of Fame and the Canadian Football Hall of Fame.

Playing career

College
With the Georgia Southern Eagles, Ham helped lead the team to back-to-back Division I-AA titles. The Eagles defeated Furman in the 1985 NCAA Division I-AA Football Championship Game, with Ham throwing for 419 yards and four touchdowns along with running in a two-point conversion. The following year, the Eagles defeated Arkansas State in the 1986 NCAA Division I-AA Football Championship Game, with Ham rushing for 180 yards and three touchdowns, while also passing for 306 yards and one touchdown. In 2007, Ham was inducted into the College Football Hall of Fame.

Professional
After his college career, Ham was drafted by the Los Angeles Rams in the 9th round of the 1987 NFL Draft. However, on May 22, 1987, Ham signed a three-year deal with the Edmonton Eskimos of the CFL due to a belief that NFL teams wanted him to play a position other than quarterback. With the Eskimos, he served as the third-string quarterback behind Matt Dunigan and Damon Allen and was a member of their Grey Cup winning team that season. With the trading of Dunigan to the BC Lions and injuries to Allen, Ham established himself as their new starting quarterback. He passed for 2840 yards and ran for another 628. In 1989, he won the CFL's Most Outstanding Player Award in leading the Eskimos to a 16-2 record, throwing for 4366 yards on 268 completions out of 517 attempts with 30 touchdowns to 18 interceptions. Ham became the first CFL quarterback to rush for over 1,000 yards with 1005 on 125 carries and with 10 touchdowns. Unfortunately for the Eskimos, they were upset in the West Division Final to the 9-9 Saskatchewan Roughriders, who went on to win the Grey Cup.

In 1990 Ham added another 1000 yard rushing season with 1096 and passed for 4286 yards leading the Eskimos to the Grey Cup. However, the team was handily beaten by the Winnipeg Blue Bombers 50-11. The next year Ham ran for 998 yards and passed for 3862. Ham endured an injury plagued season in 1992 but played well enough to pass for 3655 yards and to run for 655. He was dealt to the Toronto Argonauts in a blockbuster eight-for-eight trade 1993, but the Argos suffered through a 3-15 record. He threw for 2147 yards and ran for 605, struggling to adapt to the Run & Shoot offense.

With the CFL expanding into the United States, Ham joined the newly-established Baltimore team in 1994. He gained his last plus 4000 yard passing season with 4348 and ran for 613 yards. Ham led the team, not yet named the Stallions, to the Grey Cup, where they were defeated by the Lions. Finally, in 1995, Ham led the Stallions to the only Grey Cup win by a US-based team in a 37-20 defeat of the Calgary Stampeders; he won Grey Cup MVP honours for his efforts. In the regular season, he passed for 3357 yards and ran for 610.

With the demise of the US-based teams, the core of the Stallions franchise was transferred to Montreal where they became the third incarnation of the Alouettes. The team's offense was geared to the running attack, especially when Mike Pringle returned from the NFL midway through the 1996 season. Ham would spend two seasons as the clear-cut starting quarterback, but in 1998 he began to share passing duties with Anthony Calvillo and he retired after the 1999 season.

In his career from 1987 to 1999 Ham accumulated 40,534 passing yards which currently ranks seventh all-time. He threw 4943 times with 2670 completions, 164 interceptions and 284 touchdowns. His 8043 rushing yards presently puts him in tenth all time and second among quarterbacks, behind only Damon Allen. He tallied 1059 carries with 62 touchdowns. In 2010, Ham was inducted into the Canadian Football Hall of Fame.

Coaching career
In 2002, Ham was hired to serve as head coach of the Clark Atlanta Panthers football team. He led the Panthers to records of 2–9 in 2002 and 0–11 in 2003 before he was fired prior to the start of the 2004 season.

Head coaching record

References

External links
 

1965 births
Living people
African-American coaches of American football
African-American players of American football
African-American players of Canadian football
American football quarterbacks
American players of Canadian football
Baltimore Stallions players
Canadian Football Hall of Fame inductees
Canadian Football League Most Outstanding Player Award winners
Canadian football quarterbacks
Clark Atlanta Panthers football coaches
College Football Hall of Fame inductees
Edmonton Elks players
Georgia Southern Eagles football players
Montreal Alouettes players
Sportspeople from Gainesville, Florida
Toronto Argonauts players
21st-century African-American people
20th-century African-American sportspeople
Players of American football from Gainesville, Florida